Naqsh-i-Jahan (نقش جہان) was khan of Moghulistan from 1415 to 1418. He was son of Shams-i-Jahan.

15th-century Mongol rulers
Chagatai khans